The Grisamore House is a historic home located in downtown Jeffersonville, Indiana.  It was built by two brothers from Philadelphia, David and Wilson Grisamore, in 1837.  It is a -story, Federal style brick double house with Greek Revival style design elements.  The front facade features three stucco-coated, two-story Doric order columns in antis and two projecting second story balconies.  It has housed several Jeffersonville families of importance.  Future president William Henry Harrison gave a speech on the front porch in 1840 while campaigning to become president.

In the 1930s it was the Decker Art Studio.

It suffered fire damage in 1981,  but was saved from destruction by the Jeff-Clark Preservation, Inc.  In 1983 it was added to National Register of Historic Places. It is now part of the Old Jeffersonville Historic District, and houses private businesses.  The Historic Landmarks Foundation of Indiana formerly had its Southern Indiana regional office here before they relocated the Willey House next to the Grisamore House.

References

External links

Jeffersonville, Indiana
Historic American Buildings Survey in Indiana
Houses on the National Register of Historic Places in Indiana
Greek Revival houses in Indiana
Federal architecture in Indiana
Houses completed in 1837
Houses in Clark County, Indiana
National Register of Historic Places in Clark County, Indiana